Aethes capnospila is a species of moth of the  family Tortricidae. It is found in Asia Minor.

References

Moths described in 1959
capnospila
Moths of Asia